Donald Garrow (25 January 1918 – 25 February 2001) was a British alpine skier. He competed in three events at the 1948 Winter Olympics.

References

1918 births
2001 deaths
British male alpine skiers
Olympic alpine skiers of Great Britain
Alpine skiers at the 1948 Winter Olympics
People from Cuckfield